Jackson Township is one of the 17 townships of Stark County, Ohio, United States.  The 2010 census found 40,152 people in the township, 37,484 of whom lived in the unincorporated portions of the township.

Geography
Located in the northwestern part of the county, it borders the following townships and cities:
Green - north
Lake Township - northeast corner
Plain Township - east
Canton Township - southeast corner
Perry Township - south
Tuscarawas Township - southwest corner
Lawrence Township - west
New Franklin - northwest corner

Three municipalities are located in Jackson Township: a small part of the city of Massillon in the southwest, a very small portion of the city of North Canton in the northeast, and the village of Hills and Dales in the southeast.  The unincorporated community of Marchand lies in the township's northeast.

Name and history
Stark County's Jackson Township was named for Andrew Jackson, a major general in the War of 1812 and later the seventh President of the United States (1829–1837), who was at the height of his popularity in 1815 when the Township was formed. It is one of 37 Jackson townships statewide.

In 1833, Jackson Township contained three gristmills and two saw mills.

Government
The township is governed by a three-member board of trustees, who are elected in November of odd-numbered years to a four-year term beginning on the following January 1. Two are elected in the year after the presidential election and one is elected in the year before it. There is also an elected township fiscal officer, who serves a four-year term beginning on April 1 of the year after the election, which is held in November of the year before the presidential election. Vacancies in the fiscal office or on the board of trustees are filled by the remaining trustees.  Currently, the board is composed of Chairman Todd J. Hawke, Vice-Chairman John E. Pizzino and Trustee James J. Thomas, and Fiscal Officer Randy Gonzalez.

The township's motto is "We make things happen."

Education
Public education in nearly all of Jackson Township is provided by Jackson Local Schools, of which Chris DiLoreto is the superintendent. This district is made up of four elementary schools: Sauder, Amherst, Lake Cable, and Strausser; one middle school; and one high school. Jackson High School underwent a significant renovation in 2007. The district was rated excellent with distinction by the state of Ohio for the 2010–2011 school year.

A small section in the southeastern corner of Jackson Township is served by the Plain Local School District. The village of Hills and Dales is also served by that district.

Jackson Township has a public library, a branch of Stark County District Library.

Point of interest
Jackson Bog State Nature Preserve
Jackson Amphitheater

References

External links
Township website
County website 
Jackson Local Schools
Jackson Amphitheater website
Jackson Towhnship Historical Society

Townships in Stark County, Ohio
Urban townships in Ohio
Townships in Ohio